The 2009 Rolex 24 at Daytona Presented by Crown Royal Cask No. 16 is the first round of the 2009 Rolex Sports Car Series season. It took place at Daytona International Speedway between January 24–25, 2009. David Donohue won the race 40 years after his father won by holding off a furious charge from NASCAR driver Juan Pablo Montoya in the closest finish in race history.

Race results
Class winners in bold.

24 Hours of Daytona
Daytona
24 Hours of Daytona
24 Hours of Daytona